Badingham is a civil parish in the East Suffolk district of eastern England, in the county of Suffolk. It is situated 21.8 miles (35.1 kilometres) north east of Ipswich, 35 miles away from Norwich and 13 miles away from the coast. With the road "A1120" slicing through the middle of the parish.
Badingham's name is Anglo-Saxon and means "the farmstead of Beada's people". Badingham contains a significant number of farms, sparse amount of housing, numerous B&Bs as well as St. John's Church.

Population 
At the 2011 census, Badingham had a total population of 489. The village's population was at its maximum of 607 in 1801. Out of the 489 residents in 2011, 173 (35%) of residents were over the age of 50, whereas in comparison, there were only 128 people in the 0–20 age group. The aging population has changed the services within the parish, towards more care & 50+ services, with no schools, as indicated by data from the 2011 census.

Housing 
In Badingham, a reduction in population over the last century has corresponded with the reduction in dwellings, such as the housing numbers during the years of 1901–1961 where they decreased from 143 to 125. But in the past few decades, there has been an increase in housing in the area, despite the decrease in population, for example from the 2001 to the 2011 census, the number of houses increased from 206 to 228.

History 

In the 1870s John Bartholomew, described Badingham as:
"Badingham, par., E. Suffolk, 3½ miles NE. of Framlingham ry. sta., 3172 ac., pop. 672; P.O.(John Bartholomew, Gazetteer of the British Isles (1887))".
The earliest historic data of Badingham is located within the Domesday Book.
The recordings are indicated below:
"Badincham / Hadincham: Robert Malet's mother and Walter, Loernic and Robert from her. Church, beehive. 60 goats, 32 pigs. Partly Norman church Okenhill Hall, 1552".

St. Johns Church 
The parish church is situated on an old pagan holy site called the knoll of Burstonhaugh. The church was built in 1300s and later re-established in 16th century to an old pagan site, by the first missionaries who came to Badingham.
Upon sunrise the light shines through the east window, signifying that the church faces north-east to south-west instead of the more usual east–west.

Village hall 
The village hall is at the centre of village life and aims to establish an affordable, place where social activity can occur in an otherwise isolated village. The hall itself is a vital focal point for regular activities including:
"pre-school and crèche, village meetings and other large group activities and celebrations".

Badingham Parish Council 
Badingham's parish is one of the largest within the region of Suffolk Coastal District Council, and extends to more than eleven square miles. The neighbouring parishes are Dennington, Laxfield, Peasenhall, Bruisyard and Cransford.

Census data 
  The graphs indicate the difference between occupations in the parish of Badingham during 1881 and 2011, showing how times have changed in the village, with the reduction in the number of men employed in the agricultural sector in 1881, compared to 2011 (when men and women were equally represented). The most common occupation is now in information and communications.

References

External links 

  Community website
  Parish Council website
 

Villages in Suffolk
Civil parishes in Suffolk